The Établissements français de l'Inde, previously known as Indes orientales was a constituency in the French National Assembly between 1789 and 1954.

It was succeeded by India's Puducherry constituency in the Lok Sabha.

Constituent Assembly of 1789 
Député des Indes orientales elected by the Assembly of Pondichéry.
 Philibert-Augustin-Bernard de Beylié (1789–1791)
 Joseph de Kerjean (1789–1790, abstentionist)
 Jean-Louis Monneron (1790–1791)

Second Republic 
 Lecour de Grandmaison (Jan–May 1849)
 Auguste Bourgoin (His deputy, sat from 24 April 1849 to 26 May 1849)

Third Republic 
 Pierre Desbassayns de Richemont (1871–1876, then senator from 1876 to 1882)
 Jules Godin (1876–1881, then senator from 1891 to 1900)
 Louis Alype dit Pierre-Alype (1881–1898)
 Louis Henrique-Duluc (1898–1906)
 Philema Lemaire (1906–1910)
 Paul Bluysen (1910–1924, then senator from 1924 to 1928)
 Gabriel Louis Angoulvant (from 1924 to 1928)
 Jean Coponat (1928–1932)
 Pierre Dupuy (1932–1942)

Fourth Republic 
 Deiva Zivarattinam (1945–1946) - UDSR
 Lambert Saravane (1946–1951) - UDSR, later with French India Socialist Party
 Édouard Goubert (1951–1954) - French India Socialist Party (UDSR affiliate)

External links 
 Biography of the deputies of the EFI on the site of the French National Assembly

Puducherry-related lists
India
Colonial India
French India
Colonial
Elections in Puducherry